The 1982–83 New York Knicks season was the 37th season for the team in the National Basketball Association (NBA). In the regular season, the Knicks started off by losing their first seven games of the season, but improved during the second half of their schedule. They finished in fourth place in the Atlantic Division with a 44–38 win–loss record, and qualified for the NBA Playoffs. New York defeated the New Jersey Nets 2–0 in the best-of-three first round of the playoffs and advanced to the Eastern Conference Semifinals, where they were swept in four games by the eventual NBA champion Philadelphia 76ers.

NBA Draft

Note: This is not an extensive list; it only covers the first and second rounds, and any other players picked by the franchise that played at least one game in the league.

Roster

Regular season

Season standings

z – clinched division title
y – clinched division title
x – clinched playoff spot

Record vs. opponents

Playoffs

|- align="center" bgcolor="#ccffcc"
| 1
| April 20
| @ New Jersey
| W 118–107
| Bernard King (40)
| Marvin Webster (11)
| Rory Sparrow (7)
| Brendan Byrne Arena15,672
| 1–0
|- align="center" bgcolor="#ccffcc"
| 2
| April 21
| New Jersey
| W 105–99
| Truck Robinson (22)
| Truck Robinson (13)
| Paul Westphal (7)
| Madison Square Garden19,591
| 2–0
|-

|- align="center" bgcolor="#ffcccc"
| 1
| April 24
| @ Philadelphia
| L 102–112
| Bill Cartwright (17)
| Bill Cartwright (8)
| Rory Sparrow (10)
| Spectrum14,375
| 0–1
|- align="center" bgcolor="#ffcccc"
| 2
| April 27
| @ Philadelphia
| L 91–98
| Truck Robinson (22)
| Truck Robinson (14)
| Rory Sparrow (8)
| Spectrum15,829
| 0–2
|- align="center" bgcolor="#ffcccc"
| 3
| April 30
| Philadelphia
| L 105–107
| Bernard King (21)
| Truck Robinson (15)
| Rory Sparrow (6)
| Madison Square Garden17,735
| 0–3
|- align="center" bgcolor="#ffcccc"
| 4
| May 1
| Philadelphia
| L 102–105
| Bernard King (35)
| Truck Robinson (15)
| Sparrow, Westphal (8)
| Madison Square Garden15,457
| 0–4
|-

References

New York Knicks seasons
New
New York Knicks
New York Knicks
1980s in Manhattan
Madison Square Garden